Bradford Grammar School (BGS) is a co-educational private day school located in Frizinghall, Bradford, West Yorkshire, England.  
Entrance is by examination, except for the sixth form, where admission is based on GCSE results. The school gives means-tested bursaries to help with fees. Unlike many independent schools, BGS does not offer scholarships based on academic achievement.

History
The school was founded in 1548 and granted its Charter by King Charles II in 1662. The Reverend William Hulton Keeling became the headmaster in 1871. He had transformed the grammar school in Northampton, and here he did the same, joining forces with the merchant Jacob Behrens, Bradford Observer editor William Byles and Vincent William Ryan Vicar of Bradford. The school was considered as good as the best public schools in 1895 and Keeling died in 1916 having been given the Freedom of the City. His daughter was Dorothy Keeling ran The Bradford Guild of Help and transformed voluntary work in the UK.

Second World War
The new school building in Frizinghall was actually completed in 1939, however the start of the Second World War prevented the building from being opened as a school. During the war, the main school building was used as a Primary Training Centre, and there is still evidence of this around the building. During this time, many BGS pupils were evacuated to Settle, and returned when the building was released from army occupation and completed. Inside the school there is a large memorial to the former pupils who died in the war.

Frizinghall railway station
Frizinghall railway station closed in 1965 and remained closed for 22 years. During this time, staff and pupils at the school campaigned to get the station reopened. In the end, it was due to the efforts of an English teacher, Robin Sisson, that the station was reopened as a halt.

Until 1975 it was a direct grant grammar school, and when this scheme was abolished it chose to become independent.

Heliport
The school grounds have been used as a helicopter landing ground by the royal family when they are visiting the locality. The most recent landing was by King Charles the third during his first trip to West Yorkshire.

Faculty
Headmaster Simon Hinchliffe is a member of the Headmasters' and Headmistresses' Conference (HMC).

Education

In 2013, the pass rate for both GCSE (Grades A* – C) and A-Levels was 99%. 31 courses are offered for A-Levels, and 97% of sixth-form pupils went on to study further education or deferred a year. The standard requirement for entry to the sixth form is nine B grades at GCSE, in 2008 the lower sixth had an average equivalent to ten A grades at GCSE.

Facilities
Over the past 15 years the school has completed a £14 million buildings development programme.

In 2001 the school built a multi-million pound Sixth Form Centre, funded primarily by Roger Evans and by pupil fundraising. Former pupil David Hockney contributed to the funding of the large theatre, where many school productions are performed, adjacent to the sports hall. The school's computing facilities have been updated regularly in the past few years, and the school now has ten IT suites.

Extra-curricular activities

Sport
The school's first sport for boys is rugby union, and for girls it is netball or hockey. Other sports at the school include orienteering, squash, tennis, table tennis, cross country, swimming, water polo, cricket, and rowing on the River Aire.

The school has an all-weather pitch used for hockey as well as nine courts used for netball and tennis. The £1m pavilion, built in 2008, contains changing rooms and space for functions. The school has two squash courts (each with their own showers and changing rooms). BGS has four rugby pitches, which in the summer are converted into two cricket grounds. The school has an equipped gym—with eleven rowing machines, two treadmills, two crossfit machines, and weights—which was modernised in 2011. A 25-metre swimming pool is used for swimming and water polo training at lunchtimes and evenings.

Cadet Force

As an alternative or a supplement to extra-curricular sport, the school maintains a volunteer Combined Cadet Force. In the 1980s, this was reduced to just the Army contingent. However, the RAF section has since been reopened, and pupils  fly and partake in RAF courses. The school owns its own 25-metre shooting range.

Music
Musical groups and clubs that run for pupils include: Concert Band, Senior Orchestra, Junior Orchestra, junior and senior choirs and chamber choirs, Close Harmony Group, Big Band, Samba Band, String Group, Dixieland Crackerjacks, Junior and Senior brass group, junior and senior saxophone groups, and Soul Band.

Arts

The interior walls of the school are decorated with artwork by pupils and a number of David Hockney's works are on display in public and private areas of the school. The music suite has several practice rooms and holds concerts throughout the year. A musical is staged every two years. The Hockney Theatre hosts a programme through the year and a full-time technician manages a student production team to service the performances. Curriculum evenings by the lower school drama groups or the A-Level Theatre Studies groups are placed between plays written specifically for pupils, Shakespeare performances, comedies and musicals.

Alumni

John Sharp (1645–1714), Archbishop of York
Abraham Sharp (1653–1742), mathematician and scientific instrument maker
David Hartley (1705–1757), philosopher and physician
John William Whittaker (1790–1854), clergyman
Louis Addin Kershaw (1845–1899), Chief justice
Frederick Delius (1862–1934), composer
Ernest Leopold Sichel (1862–1941), artist
Sir Charles Harris (1864–1943), civil servant
Henry de Beltgens Gibbins (1865–1907), economic historian
John Coates (1865–1941), singer
William Binnie (1867–1949), civil engineer
Sir Frank Watson Dyson (1868–1939), Astronomer Royal
Charles Wilson(1869–1959), physicist
John Lawrence Hammond (1872–1949), historian and journalist
Sir William Rothenstein (1872–1945), artist
 Henry Ernest Stapleton (1878-1962), chemist, numismatist
Christopher Lintrup Paus
Albert Rutherston (1881–1953), painter and illustrator
Humbert Wolfe (1885–1930), poet and civil servant
Charles Fairburn (1887–1945), railway engineer
Eric Craven Gregory (1887-1959), benefactor of the arts
John Rawlings Rees (1890–1969), psychiatrist
Sir Mortimer Wheeler (1890–1976), archaeologist and broadcaster
Arthur Raistrick (1896–1991), civil engineer, industrial archaeologist and pacifist
Harry McEvoy (1902–1984), breakfast cereal manufacturer
Richard Eurich (1903–1992), painter
H. L. A. Hart (1907–1992), legal philosopher
Geoffrey Barraclough (1908–1984), historian
William Henry Walsh (1913–1986), philosopher
Kenneth Garside (1913–1983), Academic Librarian and Military Intelligence Officer
Michael Wharton (1913–2006), columnist Peter Simple
Alan Bullock (1914–2004), a.k.a. Baron Bullock of Leafield, historian
Denis Healey, Baron Healey (1917–2015), Chancellor of the Exchequer
Sir Ken Morrison (1931–2017), Executive Chairman of Morrisons
Rt Rev Alan Smithson (1936–2010), Bishop of Jarrow
David Hockney (born 1937), artist
Sir Duncan Nicol CBE, Chief Executive of NHS, 1985 -1993
David Miliband (born 1965), former Secretary of State for Foreign and Commonwealth Affairs
Malcolm Laycock (1938–2009), radio presenter and producer
Vivian Nutton (born 1943), classicist and medical historian
Paul Slack (born 1943), historian
Michael Jack (born 1946), politician
Jonathan Silver (1949–1997), entrepreneur and art gallery owner
Colin Lawson (born 1949) clarinetist, academic and Director of the Royal College of Music
Nick Toczek (born 1950), writer and performer
Victoria Braithwaite (1967–2019), animal behaviour scientist
Boris Rankov (born 1954), Professor of Roman History at Royal Holloway, University of London; 6-time Boat Race winner with Oxford
John Bainbridge Webster (born 1955), Chair of Systematic Theology at King's College, University of Aberdeen
Alistair Campbell (born 1957), journalist, former Downing Street Press Secretary (1997–2000) and the first Downing Street Director of Communications (2000–2005)
Sir David Wootton (born 1958), Lord Mayor of London
Roger Mosey (born 1958), Master of Selwyn College, Cambridge
John Mann, (born 1960), Member of Parliament for Bassetlaw
 Steven Wells (1960–2009) Ranting poet, punk journalist, novelist, comedy writer for On The Hour.
Ashley Metcalfe (born 1963), former Yorkshire County Cricket Club cricketer
Andrew Jones (born 1963), Member of Parliament for Harrogate and Knaresborough
Adrian Moorhouse (born 1964), Olympic gold medallist swimmer
Richard Nerurkar, (born 1964), marathon and 10,000 metres runner
Enzo Cilenti, (born 1974) actor
Robert Ashforth, (born 1976) professional rugby union player (Fly half)
Robert Hardy (born 1980), bassist of Franz Ferdinand
Jon Sen, (born 1974) TV producer, Executive Producer EastEnders
Dan Scarbrough (born 1978), England rugby union player (Full back / Wing)
Charlie Hodgson (born 1980), England rugby union player (Fly half)
Benson Taylor (born 1983), film composer
Uzair Mahomed (born 1987), cricketer
Alistair Brownlee (born 1988) British triathlete; brother of Jonathan Brownlee
Jonathan Brownlee (born 1990) British triathlete; brother of Alistair Brownlee.
Georgie Henley (born 1995), actress
John Hollingworth (born 1981), English actor

See also
Listed buildings in Bradford (Manningham Ward)

References

External links
 
 BGS Old Bradfordian Association
 BGS Boat Club website

Member schools of the Headmasters' and Headmistresses' Conference
Private schools in the City of Bradford
Schools in Bradford
Educational institutions established in the 1540s
1548 establishments in England